The Lansdale/Doylestown Line is a SEPTA Regional Rail line connecting Center City Philadelphia to Doylestown in Bucks County, Pennsylvania. Until 1981, diesel-powered trains continued on the Bethlehem Branch from Lansdale to Quakertown, Bethlehem, and Allentown. Restored service has been proposed, but is not planned by SEPTA. The line is currently used by the East Penn Railroad, serving Quakertown's industrial complexes and distribution centers. With around 17,000 daily riders every weekday in 2019, it is the second busiest line in SEPTA's Regional Rail network.

History

The Lansdale/Doylestown Line utilizes what is known as the SEPTA Main Line, a four-track line that has been owned by SEPTA since 1983. Prior to that, it was owned by Conrail between 1976 and 1983 and by the Reading Railroad before 1976. The main part of the line, from Philadelphia north to Lansdale, was part of the Reading Railroad's northbound route from Philadelphia to Bethlehem, and then to Wilkes-Barre and Scranton.

Originally arriving and departing at the former Reading Terminal, now part of the Pennsylvania Convention Center, the line has, since 1985, been directly connected to the ex-PRR/Penn Central side by the Center City Commuter Rail Tunnel. Unlike the ex-PRR/Penn Central Paoli/Thorndale Line it is often paired with for through-service, the ex-RDG line was not as heavily built, as the RDG segregated its through-freight and passenger movements. While the four-track section between the tunnel and Wayne Junction and the two-track section from Wayne Junction to Jenkintown are grade-separated, the two-track section from Jenkintown to Lansdale and the single track from Lansdale to Doylestown has both at-grade railroad crossings and over- and underpasses.

Electrified service between Philadelphia and Hatboro, Lansdale, Doylestown and West Trenton was opened on July 26, 1931. Equipment consisted of dark green painted electric multiple unit cars built at the Reading's own shops.  Some of the cars were rebuilt during the 1960s receiving air conditioning, refreshed interior and a new blue paint scheme resulting in their being referred to as "Blueliners". Today, the line uses the Silverliner family of EMU cars which operate throughout SEPTA's Regional Rail system.

Service to Bethlehem and the Lehigh Valley languished due to the post-World War II surge of the automobile as well as the opening of the Pennsylvania Turnpike Northeast Extension in 1957. Service north of Lansdale in the non-electrified territory was terminated by SEPTA on July 29, 1981. Trackage north of Quakertown was dismantled after the railbed was leased for use as the interim Saucon Rail Trail.

Between 1984–2010 the route was designated R5 Doylestown and R5 Lansdale as part of SEPTA's diametrical reorganization of its lines. Lansdale and Doylestown trains operated through the city center to the Paoli Line on the ex-Pennsylvania side of the system. The R-number naming system was dropped on July 25, 2010. , most Lansdale/Doylestown Line trains continue through Center City to Wilmington or Newark on the Wilmington/Newark Line on weekdays and to Malvern or Thorndale on the Paoli/Thorndale Line on weekends.

On August 29, 2011, SEPTA adjusted the midday service pattern to encourage ridership at Colmar station, which had available parking capacity immediately adjacent to Pennsylvania Route 309. Previously, every other train turned back at Lansdale; those trains now call at Colmar before terminating at Link Belt, providing half-hourly service at Colmar between the morning and afternoon rush hours.

On December 18, 2011, SEPTA eliminated weekend service at Link Belt and New Britain due to low ridership. In the fall of 2012, New Britain was added back to the weekend schedule as a flag stop.

A large parking garage opened at Lansdale station on April 17, 2017, offering space for over 600 vehicles. 9th Street station opened nearby in 2015 as an alternate parking location during construction, and remains open as part of planned transit-oriented development.

SEPTA activated positive train control on the Lansdale/Doylestown Line from Doylestown to Glenside on June 13, 2016. Positive train control was activated from Glenside to Fern Rock on December 12, 2016 and from Fern Rock to 30th Street on January 9, 2017.

On April 9, 2020, service on the line was truncated to  due to the COVID-19 pandemic. Service to Doylestown resumed on June 22, 2020.

Stations

The Lansdale/Doylestown Line makes the following station stops after leaving the Center City Commuter Connection; stations indicated with a gray background are closed.

Ridership
Between FY 2008–FY 2019 yearly ridership on the Lansdale/Doylestown Line has held steady at 4.6 million, save for dips to 4.3 million in FY 2010–2011 and FY 2017 and spikes to around 5 million in FY 2016 and FY 2019.

Notes

References

External links

SEPTA Regional Rail
Reading Company lines